Lovesexy is the tenth studio album by American recording artist Prince. The album was released on May 10, 1988 by Paisley Park Records and Warner Bros. Records. The album was recorded in just seven weeks, from mid-December 1987 to late January 1988, at Prince's new Paisley Park Studios, and most of the album is a solo effort from Prince, with a few exceptions. The lyrical themes of the record include positivity, self-improvement, spirituality, and God.

Receiving mixed reviews, Lovesexy reached number 11 on the Billboard 200, his first album since 1981's Controversy not to crack the top-10, and number one in the Netherlands, New Zealand, Sweden, Switzerland and the UK. It spawned three singles; "Alphabet St." became a worldwide top-10 hit in the spring of 1988, whereas the follow-up singles "Glam Slam" and "I Wish U Heaven" failed to reach the Billboard Hot 100. Subsequently, it was Prince's least successful album in the United States since 1980. It was certified Gold by the Recording Industry Association of America (RIAA) in December 1988.

Lovesexy was accompanied by the critically acclaimed Lovesexy Tour, of which the September 9th Dortmund show in Germany was released on video cassette and LaserDisc. It was also televised (with a short delay for editorial purposes) on several European channels, with the broadcast containing various alternate camera shots in place of the ones used in the officially released video, which was released a year later in 1989.

Recording 
The opening track, "👁 No", was recorded with the full band (Miko Weaver on guitar, Levi Seacer, Jr. on bass, Doctor Fink and Boni Boyer on keyboards, Eric Leeds on saxophone, Atlanta Bliss on trumpet and Sheila E. on drums). Sheila E., in fact, plays drums on several tracks and sings backup, along with Boyer. Leeds and Bliss provide horns on most tracks, and Ingrid Chavez provides the intro to "👁 No". The album is designed to be heard in the context of a continuous sequence: LP pressings split the album in two side-long tracks, without visual bands to indicate individual songs. Similarly, early CD copies of Lovesexy have the entire album in sequence as a single track, though some later editions have it as nine separate tracks. Lovesexy is also the first Prince album to replace the pronoun "I" with a stylized "👁" symbol, commonly Romanized as "eye" (i.e. "Eye No"), in both song titles and liner notes; the symbol would not be completely adopted, however, until 1992's Love Symbol Album.

Music
The theme of the album is the struggle between good and evil. God and Satan, virtue and sin (although, with the Gemini character that he developed in 1989, these "sides" may also represent "ego and alter-ego"), the perennial themes of Prince's work, mix as Prince climaxes to "Love is God, God is love, girls and boys love God above" in the song "Anna Stesia".

Prince refers to Lovesexy as a gospel album. It opens with a sermon of sorts; "👁 No", a positive energetic track advising people to be free from their vices and to reject Satan, and affirming his belief in God, while using his bully pulpit to encourage the listener to do the same. "👁 No" is a reworking of a song called "The Ball" from the unreleased Crystal Ball. The song ends with a scale of horns and a segue of conversations (originally recorded on "👁 No"'s original version "The Ball" which segued into another song; the "conversations", or background party ambiance, was later used on the Graffiti Bridge album as a segue between "We Can Funk" and "Joy in Repetition") leading to the album's biggest-selling single, "Alphabet St.", which mixes dance music, rock and rap along with playful lyrics about sex, braggadocio, and the heavenly state of feeling "lovesexy". Next is "Glam Slam", a busy dance track which features Prince's full band. It speaks to the uplifting interlude between Prince and a woman, and how, when he fell down, she lifted him. It also praises the woman's love and sense of humanity. The song ends with an almost classical music string solo (performed on keyboard). Ending side one of the vinyl release is "Anna Stesia", a heartfelt confessional number divulging various sins of the flesh, and ends with Prince promising to dedicate his life and music to God.

Side two opens with the machine gun-like pace of "Dance On", which lambastes negative aspects of society, somewhat akin to "Sign O' the Times". The title track follows, described by Prince as "The feeling you get when you fall in love ... not with a boy or girl but with the heavens above," and it is another energetic dance track; the "Good News" indeed Prince extols its virtues graphically and then he and Cat Glover share an orgasm, both using sped up Camille-like vocals, going from Prince's voice to Cat's. This leads into "When 2 R in Love", a sex-infused ballad recorded during the sessions for the untitled black album. Next is the almost sparse, but uplifting "I Wish U Heaven", which says that no matter what controversy or opposition one may bring, the end result is still wishing your enemy the best. It follows a Biblical proverb about "blessing those that curse you, loving those that hate you, for it heaps hot coals on their heads". The last track is "Positivity", which echoes the theme of "Dance On". It extols the virtues of staying positive, while asking the listener to examine examples of negativity and negative aspects of the world; overlooking the quick thrill and pushing toward being positive throughout it. The song continuously asks the question "Have you had your plus sign today?" The vocals are sung, but the bridge and extended portions are more of a spoken rap-type style that Prince had started to display as early as "Annie Christian" in 1981. The song ends with sounds of water rushing and a river over keyboard chords. This final song was later given to Mavis Staples for her 1991 album, The Voice.

Critical reception

The cover (based on a photo by Jean Baptiste Mondino) caused some controversy upon release as it depicts Prince in the nude. Some record stores refused to stock it or wrapped the album in black, although Lovesexy had been issued as a replacement for the hastily withdrawn The Black Album, which had an achromatic black cover.

Lovesexy was Prince's least successful album since 1981, failing to break the top 10, being certified Gold and spending just 21 weeks on the US Billboard 200. While "Alphabet St." managed to crack the top 10, it did not make a lasting impression and the subsequent two single releases failed to chart on the Hot 100. The situation in the United Kingdom was more positive, where the album debuted at number 1 and all the singles became top 40 hits.

Track listing

Sample credits
 The opening to "👁 No" contains a sample from a Roger Limb track "Passing Clouds", created at the BBC Radiophonic Workshop released in 1971 on the Out of this World album.

Notes
 The "👁" in "👁 No" is actually represented by a stylized eye symbol in place of the pronoun "I" throughout the liner notes. It is commonly transliterated as "Eye" because of "I Wish U Heaven"'s placement later on the album.
 First pressings of the compact disc feature all content on a single track. Likewise, the vinyl edition presented each side of vinyl with no track indexes. Some later pressings of both CD and vinyl featured nine separate tracks. When Prince's music was added to digital stores and streaming services in 2017, Lovesexy was made available in its single track format only. However, a tracked version was later released digitally in 2021.

Personnel

 Prince – lead vocals and various instruments (credited solely with "whatever" in the liner notes)
 Sheila E. – drums (1-3, 8), drums and backing vocals (5, 9)
 Boni Boyer – keyboards (1), backing vocals (4, 9)
 Dr. Fink – keyboards (1) 
 Miko Weaver – guitar (1)
 Levi Seacer, Jr. – bass (1) 
 Eric Leeds – saxophone (1, 2, 9) 
 Atlanta Bliss – trumpet (1, 2, 9)
 Ingrid Chavez – spoken intro (1)
 Cat Glover – rap (2), backing vocals (4)

Singles and Hot 100 chart placings
 "Alphabet St." (#8 US, #3 US R&B, #9 UK)
 "Alphabet St. – part 1" – 7" version only
 "Alphabet St. – part 2" – 7" version only
 "Alphabet St." – 12" version only
 "Alphabet St. – This is not music, this is a trip" – 12" version only

 "Glam Slam" (#44 US R&B, #29 UK)
 "Glam Slam" – 7" version only
 "Glam Slam (Remix)" – 12" version only
 "Escape (Free yo mind from this rat race)"

 "I Wish U Heaven" (#18 US R&B, #24 UK)
 "I Wish U Heaven" – 7" version only
 "I Wish U Heaven (Part 1, 2 and 3)" – 12" version only
 "Scarlet Pussy"

Charts

Weekly charts

Year-end charts

Certifications and sales

Notes

References

External links
 Lovesexy at Discogs

1988 albums
Prince (musician) albums
Albums produced by Prince (musician)
Paisley Park Records albums
Warner Records albums
Albums recorded in a home studio